Bernard Bloch refers to:

 Bernard Bloch (linguist) (1907–1965), American linguist
 Bernard Bloch (actor) (born 1949), French actor